HMS Griper was a later Archer-class gunbrig launched in 1804 and wrecked in 1807.

Career
Lieutenant Edward Morris commissioned Griper in October 1804.

Griper was among the many vessels of the Boulogne squadron that shared in the proceeds of the capture off Cap Gris Nez on 24 April 1805 of a number of Dutch schuyts, most of them armed and carrying soldiers as well as their crews.

riper was among the vessels that shared in the proceeds of Frederick, captured on 2 August 1805.

Griper was among the vessels that shared in the proceeds of the capture on 22 August of Susannah Margaretha.

The next day Gripper recaptured Commerce, Wallace, master.

On 24 April 1806 Griper captured Emanuel, Ole Ambriarusen, master.

In November Lloyd's List reported that Griper had detained and sent into Yarmouth Jonge Berta, Pedersen, master, which had been sailing from Hamburg to Caen.

Fate
A storm on 18 February 1807 drove Griper, Lieutenant Morris, commander, on shore on the French coast near Ostend. She was wrecked and there were no survivors.

Notes, citations, and references
Notes

Citations

References
 
 

1804 ships
Brigs of the Royal Navy
Maritime incidents in 1807